Americana (also known as American roots music) is an amalgam of American music formed by the confluence of the shared and varied traditions that make up the musical ethos of the United States, specifically those sounds that are emerged from the Southern United States such as folk, gospel, blues, country, jazz, rhythm and blues, rock and roll, bluegrass, and other external influences.

Definition 
Americana, as defined by the Americana Music Association (AMA), is "contemporary music that incorporates elements of various American roots music styles, including country, roots-rock, folk, bluegrass, R&B and blues, resulting in a distinctive roots-oriented sound that lives in a world apart from the pure forms of the genres upon which it may draw. While acoustic instruments are often present and vital, Americana also often uses a full electric band."

History 
The origins of Americana music can be traced back to the early 20th century, when rural American musicians began incorporating elements of folk, blues, and country music into their songs. Americana musicians often played acoustic instruments such as the guitar, banjo, fiddle, and upright bass, and their songs typically told stories about the struggles and hardships of everyday life.

In the 1950s and 1960s, Americana music began to evolve and incorporate elements of rock and roll and other popular music styles. Artists such as Bob Dylan and The Byrds began blending traditional folk and country music with electric guitars and drums, creating a new sound that came to be known as folk rock. 

In the 1990s and 2000s, Americana music underwent a resurgence in popularity, as a new generation of artists began incorporating elements of traditional American music into their songs. Artists such as Wilco, Lucinda Williams, and Gillian Welch helped to popularise a new style of Americana music that blended elements of rock, folk, country, and blues.

This new style of music reflected a renewed interest in traditional American music forms, and it helped to establish Americana music as a distinct and important genre in its own right. In 2011, the genre was officially inducted into the Merriam-Webster dictionary.

In modern times, Americana music continues to evolve and expand, as new generations of artists continue to draw inspiration from the rich history and cultural traditions of the United States. The instrumentation of Americana music continues to be characterised by acoustic guitars, fiddles, banjos, mandolins, and harmonicas, as well as electric guitars and drums. Bands like Mumford and Sons, The Lumineers and The Avett Brothers helped bring contemporary Americana to more people than ever before. Their popularity as artists took the genre (which was somewhat of a niche, in the shadow of country and rock) and made it mainstream.

The genre remains deeply rooted in the cultural and social landscape of the United States, and it continues to reflect the diverse experiences and perspectives of the American people.

Notable Americana musicians  
 Johnny Cash 
 Bob Dylan 
 Willie Nelson
 Bonnie Raitt
 Grateful Dead 
 Lucinda Williams 
 Gillian Welch
 Steve Earle 
 Jason Isbell
 The Avett Brothers 
 Mumford & Sons 
 The Lumineers

Radio format 
The radio station laying the best claim to the Americana radio format origins is KFAT in Gilroy, California, active from mid-1975 to January 1983, as described in the book Fat Chance, authored by Gilbert Klein in 2016 and published by MainFramePress.com. KFAT was succeeded by KHIP in Hollister CA, KPIG in Freedom CA, and Fat 99 KPHT-LP in Laytonville CA. Though some say Americana as a radio format had its origins in 1984 on KCSN in Northridge, California, but that did not happen until after KFAT, Gilroy went off the air when it was sold and the format changed. 

Mark Humphrey, a contributor to country/folk Frets magazine, hosted a weekly radio show called "Honky Tonk Amnesia" which played "country, folk, honky tonk, cajun, dawg, blues, and old-time music", a combination that the country music station KCSN advertised as "Americana". The format came into its own in the mid-1990s as a descriptive phrase used by radio promoters and music industry figures for traditionally-oriented songwriters and performers.

Americana type radio shows can be heard on a variety of non commercial radio stations.

Instrumentation  
 Acoustic guitar 
The acoustic guitar is perhaps the most essential instrument in Americana music. It is often used to provide the rhythmic foundation of a song, as well as to accompany vocals and other instruments. In Americana music, the acoustic guitar is often played fingerstyle, which produces a warm and organic sound that is perfect for the genre's earthy, rootsy feel.

 Banjo
The banjo is a distinctive and essential instrument in Americana music. Its bright, twangy sound is instantly recognizable and often associated with Appalachian and bluegrass music also. Banjos are often played using a technique called clawhammer, which involves striking the strings with the back of the fingernail. The banjo adds a unique texture to Americana music, and its intricate, fast-paced playing can create a driving rhythm that propels a song forward.

 Mandolin
The mandolin is a small, stringed instrument that is commonly used in folk and bluegrass music. Its bright, high-pitched sound adds a distinctive flavor to Americana music, and its fast, intricate playing can create a lively and upbeat feel. Mandolins are often played using a technique called tremolo, which involves rapidly picking the strings to create a sustained, shimmering sound.

 Fiddle 
The fiddle is a traditional stringed instrument that is often used in Americana music. Its versatile sound can create both slow, mournful melodies and fast, lively rhythms. Fiddles are often played using a technique called "sawing," which involves rapidly moving the bow back and forth across the strings to create a driving rhythm. Fiddles can add a haunting quality to Americana music and can create a sense of nostalgia and longing.

Use in Canada 
Despite the genre's most common name, it is not practiced solely by artists from the United States, as numerous artists from Canada are also prominent in the genre. Canadian bands in the genre will sometimes be referred to as Canadiana rather than Americana in Canadian media, although this is not a widely recognized synonym elsewhere. A Norwegian scene is often referred to as Nordicana.

See also 

Grammy Award for Best Americana Album
Alternative country
Country rock
Roots rock
Heartland rock
Southern rock
Americana Music Festival & Conference
Sisters Folk Festival
Mile of Music

References

External links 
 Americana Music Association
 Americana Radio Airplay Chart
 Twang Nation – Americana and Roots Music Blog
 Americana Music Show Podcast

 
American folk music
Country music genres
Radio formats
Retro-style music